Glen Lee Bonner (May 5, 1952 – October 16, 2017) was an American football running back in the National Football League who played for the San Diego Chargers. He played college football for the Washington Huskies.

Bonner died in 2017.

References

1952 births
2017 deaths
American football running backs
San Diego Chargers players
Washington Huskies football players